Henry William John Byng, 4th Earl of Strafford  (21 August 1831 – 16 May 1899) was a British peer and courtier.

Biography
Byng was the second son of George Byng, 2nd Earl of Strafford and his first wife, Agnes. From 1840 he was a Page of Honour to Queen Victoria and in 1847 was commissioned into the Coldstream Guards as a lieutenant. In 1854, he was promoted to captain, by purchase, then later the same year was appointed an adjutant and in 1865 a supernumerary major. He retired as a lieutenant-colonel. On 15 June 1878 he took over from his elder brother as Honorary Colonel of the Edmonton Royal Rifle Regiment, a militia regiment that had also been commanded by their father.
 
In 1872, Byng was made a Groom-in-Waiting and then an Equerry two years later. In 1895, he has appointed a CB and knighted KCVO in 1897. On 28 March 1898, his elder brother George Byng, 3rd Earl of Strafford, died and he succeeded to his peerages and estates and his seat in the House of Lords. 

Barely a year later, on 16 May 1899, Strafford was killed by an express train at Potters Bar railway station. Witnesses said he appeared to step in front of the approaching engine from the bottom of the slope at the end of the platform. His body was carried fifty yards down the track. A coroner's court was later told he had the nervous condition of catalepsy. The inquest jury – after considering several verdicts including suicide – returned a finding of death by misadventure.

As his sons predeceased him his peerages passed to his brother, Francis.

Family

On 15 October 1863, Strafford married Countess Henrietta Louisa Elizabeth Danneskiold-Samsøe (a maternal granddaughter of the 1st Marquess of Ailesbury) and they had four children:

Hon. George Albert Edward Alexander (1867–1893)
Hon. John George Thomas Wentworth (1870–1894)
Lady Mary Elizabeth Agnes (d. 1946), married Count Maurice de Mauny Talvande.
Lady Amy Frederica Alice (1865–1961), married Sidney James Agar, 4th Earl of Normanton.

After his wife's death in 1880, Strafford married on 6 December 1898 Cora Colgate née Smith (a wealthy American widow), but they did not have any children, Byng dying only five months later.

Strafford was buried in a family vault in the churchyard of St John's, Potter's Bar, with his first wife. In 1935, after the church had become disused and prone to vandalism, the bodies were exhumed and moved to a mausoleum at the nearby family estate of Wrotham Park.

Notes

References

Companions of the Order of the Bath
Deaths by decapitation
Coldstream Guards officers
Middlesex Militia officers
Earls in the Peerage of the United Kingdom
Knights Commander of the Royal Victorian Order
1831 births
1899 deaths
Railway accident deaths in England
Accidental deaths in England
Henry